Dennis Dioukarev (born 23 March 1993), is a Swedish politician of the Sweden Democrats. He has been Member of the Riksdag since 2014. He was the Baby of the House from 2014 to 2015, as the youngest incumbent MP.

In the Riksdag, he sits in the Committee on Finance and as a deputy of the Committee on Taxation and of the Swedish Delegation to the Nordic Council.

References
About Dennis Dioukarev at Sveriges Television (SVT)

1993 births
Living people
Politicians from Gothenburg
Members of the Riksdag 2014–2018
Members of the Riksdag 2018–2022
Members of the Riksdag 2022–2026
Linnaeus University alumni
21st-century Swedish politicians
Members of the Riksdag from the Sweden Democrats